Avramenko is a Ukrainian surname. The surname derived from Hebrew name Abram (Ruthenian version Avram) by adding a Ukrainian suffix "-enko". Abram is itself derived from Abraham.

It may refer to:

Dmitri Avramenko (born 1992), Russian footballer
Gennadi Avramenko (born 1965), Ukrainian sport shooter
Halyna Avramenko (born 1986), Ukrainian sport shooter
Roman Avramenko (born 1988), Ukrainian javelin thrower
Vasyl Avramenko (1895–1981), Ukrainian actor, dancer, choreographer, balletmaster, director, and film producer

See also
 

Ukrainian-language surnames